Baby is an Italian teen drama streaming television series created for Netflix. The first season debuted on 30 November 2018. The series follows students at an elite high school in Rome who are involved in prostitution. It is loosely based on the story of two high school girls in Rome involved in an underage prostitution ring (the "Baby Squillo" scandal) in 2014.

In December 2018, Netflix announced a second season of the series, which premiered on 18 October 2019. The series was renewed for a third and final season, which was released on 16 September 2020.

Synopsis
Inspired by the scandal of Baby Squillo of 2013, the plot develops in an elite high school in Rome. Baby follows Chiara Altieri, a rich and beautiful girl who is disillusioned with her privileged life. She soon meets Ludovica Storti, an impulsive  girl who's secretly in need of money. Ludovica soon draws Chiara into the world of underage prostitution. Ludovica becomes involved with Fiore, a dangerous man. Meanwhile, Chiara pursues a relationship with Damiano, a new student and the son of an ambassador, while hiding her secret life.

Cast and characters
 Benedetta Porcaroli as Chiara Altieri, a high school girl who lives a double life
 Alice Pagani as Ludovica Storti, a loner high school girl who meets Chiara and introduces her to the world of prostitution
 Riccardo Mandolini as Damiano Younes, Chiara's troubled  boyfriend
 Chabeli Sastre Gonzalez as Camilla Govender Rossi
 Brando Pacitto as Fabio Fedeli, Chiara and Camilla's best friend
 Lorenzo Zurzolo as Niccolò Govender Rossi, Chiara's former lover, Camilla's brother and Virginia's boyfriend
 Galatea Ranzi as Elsa Altieri Della Rocca, Chiara's mother
 Tommaso Ragno as Principal Alberto Fedeli, Fabio's father
 Massimo Poggio as Arturo Altieri, Chiara's father
 Mehdi Nebbou as Khalid Younes, a diplomat and Damiano's father
 Giuseppe Maggio as Claudio Fiorenzi (Fiore), Chiara and Ludovica's pimp
 Mirko Trovato as Brando De Sanctis, Niccolò's best friend who slept with Ludovica and released a sex tape of the two and Fabio's secret lover
 Federica Lucaferri as Virginia, Nico's girlfriend
 Beatrice Bartoni as Vanessa, Damiano's ex-girlfriend from his old neighborhood
 Isabella Ferrari as Simonetta Loreti, Ludovica's mother
 Claudia Pandolfi as Monica Petrelli, a gym teacher at Collodi who has an affair with Nico, Damiano's stepmother
 Paolo Calabresi as Saverio, Fiore's cousin and boss
 Marjo Berasategui as Rocío Govender, Camilla and Nico's mother
 Andrea Giordana as Elsa's father and Chiara's grandfather
 Max Tortora as Roberto De Sanctis, Brando's father
 Denise Capezza as Natalia
 Sergio Ruggeri as Vittorio, Nico's friend
 Filippo Marsili as Carlo, Nico's friend
 Ludovico Succio as Alessandro, a journalist and Fabio's boyfriend
 Thomas Trabacchi as Tommaso Regoli, a professor of philosophy at Collodi
 Lorenzo Gleijeses as Martino
 Massimo De Santis as Al Pacini, a private investigator
 Alessia Scriboni as Sofia Mancini
 Bruno Wolkowitch as Christophe, a French client
 Antonio Orlando as Inspector Pietro Comini
 Anna Lou Castoldi as Aurora
 Edoardo Purgatori as Lele
 Luciano Scarpa as Mario Rossi, Camilla and Nico's father
 Mario Cordova as Filippo Storti, Ludovica's father
 Marta Jacquier as Francesca Storti, Ludovica's sister
 Sebastiano Colla as Manuel Ghiri
 Silvia Pisano as Perla De Sanctis, Brando's sister
 Clotilde Sabatino as Luisa De Sanctis, Brando's mother
 Chiara Caselli as Angela, Chiara's lawyer
 Mattia Sbragia as the Dean

Episodes

Season 1 (2018)

Season 2 (2019)

Season 3 (2020)

References

External links
 
 

2010s high school television series
2010s teen drama television series
2020s high school television series
2020s teen drama television series
2018 Italian television series debuts
2020 Italian television series endings
Italian-language Netflix original programming
Prostitution in television
Television series about teenagers
Television series based on actual events
Television shows set in Rome
Works about prostitution in Italy
Works about child prostitution
2010s Italian drama television series
2020s Italian drama television series